Dashtuk may refer to:
 Dashtuk, Sistan and Baluchestan
 Dashtuk, South Khorasan

See also
 Dashtak (disambiguation)